is a Japanese confection (wagashi) consisting of sweet, pink-colored rice cake (mochi) with a red bean paste (anko) center and wrapped in a pickled cherry blossom (sakura) leaf. Different regions of Japan have different styles of sakuramochi. Kanto-style uses  to make the rice cake, and Kansai-style uses . The sweet is traditionally eaten during the spring season, especially on Girl's Day (hinamatsuri; March 3) and at flower viewing parties (hanami).
 The leaf may or may not be eaten depending on individual preference.

Types of sakuramochi 
Sakuramochi differs by shapes and recipes, depending on areas it was made.
 Kanto-style sakuramochi
 Sakuramochi made in Kanto area.
 Kanto-style sakuramochi is often sold together with Kansai-style sakuramochi in supermarkets.
 Kansai-style sakuramochi
 Sakuramochi made in Kansai area.
 Kanto-style sakuramochi is available only in the Kanto-area. "Sakuramochi" is a common term to refer to the widely available Kansai-style mochi.

See also 
 Sakurayu
 Sakura cheese
 Hwajeon
 Japanese tea ceremony
 Wajik
 Kashiwa mochi
 Hanabiramochi
 Hishi mochi
 Warabimochi
 Zunda-mochi
 Kuzumochi
 Kusa mochi
 Hyōroku mochi
 Botamochi

References

Japanese cuisine
Cherry blossom
Wagashi